Microsoft Outlook is a personal information manager software system from Microsoft, available as a part of the Microsoft Office and Microsoft 365 software suites. Though primarily an email client, Outlook also includes such functions as calendaring, task managing, contact managing, note-taking, journal logging and web browsing, and has also become a popular email client for many businesses. 

Individuals can use Outlook as a stand-alone application; organizations can deploy it as multi-user software (through Microsoft Exchange Server or SharePoint) for such shared functions as mailboxes, calendars, folders, data aggregation (i.e., SharePoint lists), and appointment scheduling. Apps of Outlook for mobile platforms are also offered.

Web applications 
Outlook.com is a free webmail version of Microsoft Outlook, using a similar user interface. Originally known as Hotmail, it was rebranded as Outlook.com in 2012.

Outlook on the web (previously called Exchange Web Connect, Outlook Web Access, and Outlook Web App) is a web business version of Microsoft Outlook, and is included in Office 365, Exchange Server, and Exchange Online.

Versions 
Outlook has replaced Microsoft's previous scheduling and email clients, Schedule+ and Exchange Client.

Outlook 98 and Outlook 2000 offer two configurations:
Internet Mail Only (aka IMO mode): A lighter application mode with specific emphasis on POP3 and IMAP accounts, including a lightweight Fax application.
Corporate Work group (aka CW mode): A full MAPI client with specific emphasis on Microsoft Exchange accounts.

Perpetual versions of Microsoft Outlook include:

Microsoft Outlook 

Microsoft Outlook is a part of Office Suite that can be used as a standalone application. It helps you to access Microsoft Exchange Server email. Additionally, it provides contacts, calendaring, and task management functionality. This advanced email application is widely used for business purposes. Many organizations integrate Outlook with the Microsoft Sharepoint platform for sharing crucial file data. Also, It stores a local copy of the information on your system, when you configure an email account with Outlook.

Outlook 2002 
Outlook 2002 introduced these new features:
Autocomplete for email addresses
 Colored categories for calendar items
 Group schedules
Hyperlink support in email subject lines
 Native support for Outlook.com (formerly Hotmail)
 Improved search functionality, including the ability to stop a search and resume it later
 Lunar calendar support
MSN Messenger integration
 Performance improvements
 Preview pane improvements, including the ability to: 
open hyperlinks;
respond to meeting requests; and 
display email properties without opening a message
 Reminder window that consolidates all reminders for appointments and tasks in a single view
 Retention policies for documents and email
 Security improvements, including the automatic blocking of potentially unsafe attachments and of programmatic access to information in Outlook:
 SP1 introduced the ability to view all non-digitally signed email or unencrypted email as plain text;
 SP2 allows users to—through the Registry—prevent the addition of new email accounts or the creation of new Personal Storage Tables;
 SP3 updates the object model guard security for applications that access messages and other items.
 Smart tags when Word is configured as the default email editor. This option was available only when the versions of Outlook and Word were the same, i.e. both were 2002.

Outlook 2003 
Outlook 2003 introduced these new features:
Autocomplete suggestions for a single character
Cached Exchange mode
 Colored (quick) flags
 Desktop Alert
 Email filtering to combat spam
 Images in HTML mail are blocked by default to prevent spammers from determining whether an email address is active via web beacon;
 SP1 introduced the ability to block email based on country code top-level domains;
 SP2 introduced anti-phishing functionality that automatically disables hyperlinks present in spam
 Expandable distribution lists
 Information rights management
 Intrinsic support for tablet PC functionality (e.g., handwriting recognition)
 Reading pane
 Search folders
 Unicode support

Outlook 2007 

Features that debuted in Outlook 2007 include:
 Attachment preview, with which the contents of attachments can be previewed before opening
 Supported file types include Excel, PowerPoint, Visio, and Word files. If Outlook 2007 is installed on Windows Vista, then audio and video files can be previewed. If a compatible PDF reader such as Adobe Acrobat 8.1 is installed, PDF files can also be previewed.
 Auto Account Setup, which allows users to enter a username and password for an email account without entering a server name, port number, or other information
 Calendar sharing improvements including the ability to export a calendar as an HTML file—for viewing by users without Outlook—and the ability to publish calendars to an external service (e.g., Office Web Apps) with an online provider (e.g., Microsoft account)
 Colored categories with support for user roaming, which replace colored (quick) flags introduced in Outlook 2003
 Improved email spam filtering and anti-phishing features
Postmark intends to reduce spam by making it difficult and time-consuming to send it
 Information rights management improvements with Windows Rights Management Services and managed policy compliance integration with Exchange Server 2007
 Japanese Yomi name support for contacts
 Multiple calendars can be overlaid with one another to assess details such as potential scheduling conflicts
 Ribbon (Office Fluent) interface
 Outlook Mobile Service support, which allowed multimedia and SMS text messages to be sent directly to mobile phones
 Instant search through Windows Search, an index-based desktop search platform
 Instant search functionality is also available in Outlook 2002 and Outlook 2003 if these versions are installed alongside Windows Search
 Integrated RSS aggregation
 Support for Windows SideShow with the introduction of a calendar gadget
To-Do Bar that consolidates calendar information, flagged email, and tasks from OneNote 2007, Outlook 2007, Project 2007, and Windows SharePoint Services 3.0 websites within a central location.
 The ability to export items as PDF or XPS files
 Unified messaging support with Exchange Server 2007, including features such as missed-call notifications, and voicemail with voicemail preview and Windows Media Player
 Word 2007 replaces Internet Explorer as the default viewer for HTML email, and becomes the default email editor in this and all subsequent versions.

Outlook 2010 
Features that debuted in Outlook 2010 include:
 Additional command-line switches
 An improved conversation view that groups messages based on different criteria regardless of originating folders
IMAP messages are sent to the Deleted Items folder, eliminating the need to mark messages for future deletion
 Notification when an email is about to be sent without a subject
 Quick Steps, individual collections of commands that allow users to perform multiple actions simultaneously
Ribbon interface in all views
 Search Tools contextual tab on the ribbon that appears when performing searches and that includes basic or advanced criteria filters
 Social Connector to connect to various social networks and aggregate appointments, contacts, communication history, and file attachments
 Spell check-in additional areas of the user interface
 Support for multiple Exchange accounts in a single Outlook profile
 The ability to schedule a meeting with a contact by replying to an email message
 To-Do Bar enhancements including visual indicators for conflicts and unanswered meeting requests
Voicemail transcripts for Unified Messaging communications
 Zooming user interface for calendar and mail views

Outlook 2013 
Features that debuted in Outlook 2013, which was released on January 29, 2013, include:
Attachment reminder
Exchange ActiveSync (EAS)
 Add-in resiliency
Cached Exchange mode improvements
IMAP improvements
 Outlook data file (.ost) compression
 People hub
 Startup performance improvements

Outlook 2016 
Features that debuted in Outlook 2016, include:
Attachment link to cloud resource
 Groups redesign
 Search cloud
 Clutter folder
Email Address Internationalization
Scalable Vector Graphics

Outlook 2019 
Features that debuted in Outlook 2019, include:
 Focused Inbox
 Add multiple time zones
 Listen to your emails
 Easier email sorting
 Automatic download of cloud attachments
 True Dark Mode (version 1907 onward)

Macintosh 
Microsoft also released several versions of Outlook for classic Mac OS, though it was only for use with Exchange servers. It was not provided as a component of Microsoft Office for Mac but instead made available to users from administrators or by download. The final version was Outlook for Mac 2001, which was fairly similar to Outlook 2000 and 2002 apart from being exclusively for Exchange users.

Microsoft Entourage was introduced as an Outlook-like application for Mac OS in Office 2001, but it lacked Exchange connectivity. Partial support for Exchange server became available natively in Mac OS X with Entourage 2004 Service Pack 2. Entourage is not directly equivalent to Outlook in terms of design or operation; rather, it is a distinct application that has several overlapping features including Exchange client capabilities. Somewhat improved Exchange support was added in Entourage 2008 Web Services Edition.

Entourage was replaced by Outlook for Mac 2011, which features greater compatibility and parity with Outlook for Windows than Entourage offered. It is the first native version of Outlook for MacOS.

Outlook 2011 initially supported Mac OS X's Sync Services only for contacts, not events, tasks or notes. It also does not have a Project Manager equivalent to that in Entourage. With Service Pack 1 (v 14.1.0), published on April 12, 2011, Outlook can now sync calendar, notes and tasks with Exchange 2007 and Exchange 2010.

On October 31, 2014, Microsoft released Outlook for Mac (v15.3 build 141024) with Office 365 (a software as a service licensing program that makes Office programs available as soon as they are developed). Outlook for Mac 15.3 improves upon its predecessors with:
 Better performance and reliability as a result of a new threading model and database improvements.
 A new modern user interface with improved scrolling and agility when switching between Ribbon tabs.
 Online archive support for searching Exchange (online or on-premises) archived mail.
 Master Category List support and enhancements delivering access to category lists (name and color) and sync between Mac, Microsoft Windows and OWA clients.
 Office 365 push email support for real-time email delivery.
 Faster first-run and email download experience with improved Exchange Web Services syncing.
The "New Outlook for Mac" client, included with version 16.42 and above, became available for "Early Insider" testers in the fall of 2019, with a public "Insider" debut in October 2020.  It requires macOS 10.14 or greater and introduces a redesigned interface with significantly changed internals, including native search within the client that no longer depends on macOS Spotlight.  Some Outlook features are still missing from the New Outlook client as it continues in development.

To date, the Macintosh client has never had the capability of syncing Contact Groups/Personal Distribution Lists from Exchange, Microsoft 365 or Outlook.com accounts, something that the Windows and web clients have always supported.  A UserVoice post created in December 2019 suggesting that the missing functionality be added has shown a "Planned" tag since October 2020. 

In March 2023, Microsoft announced that Outlook for Mac will be available for free. This means that users will no longer need a Microsoft 365 subscription or an Office licence to use the program.

Phones and tablets 
First released in April 2014 by the venture capital-backed startup Acompli, the company was acquired by Microsoft in December 2014. On January 29, 2015, Acompli was re-branded as Outlook Mobile—sharing its name with the Microsoft Outlook desktop personal information manager and Outlook.com email service. In January 2015, Microsoft released Outlook for phones and for tablets (v1.3 build) with Office 365.
This was the first Outlook for these platforms with email, calendar, and contacts.

On February 4, 2015, Microsoft acquired Sunrise Calendar; on September 13, 2016, Sunrise ceased to operate, and an update was released to Outlook Mobile that contained enhancements to its calendar functions.

Similar to its desktop counterpart, Outlook mobile offers an aggregation of attachments and files stored on cloud storage platforms; a "focused inbox" highlights messages from frequent contacts, and calendar events, files, and locations can be embedded in messages without switching apps. The app supports a number of email platforms and services, including Outlook.com, Microsoft Exchange and Google Workspace (formerly G Suite) among others.

Outlook mobile is designed to consolidate functionality that would normally be found in separate apps on mobile devices, similarly to personal information managers on personal computers. is designed around four "hubs" for different tasks, including "Mail", "Calendar," "Files" and "People". The "People" hub lists frequently and recently used contacts and aggregates recent communications with them, and the "Files" hub aggregates recent attachments from messages, and can also integrate with other online storage services such as Dropbox, Google Drive, and OneDrive. To facility indexing of content for search and other features, emails and other information are stored on external servers.

Outlook mobile supports a large number of different e-mail services and platforms, including Exchange, iCloud, GMail, Google Workspace (formerly G Suite), Outlook.com, and Yahoo! Mail. The app supports multiple email accounts at once.

Emails are divided into two inboxes: the "Focused" inbox displays messages of high importance, and those from frequent contacts. All other messages are displayed within an "Other" section. Files, locations, and calendar events can be embedded into email messages. Swiping gestures can be used for deleting messages.

Like the desktop Outlook, Outlook mobile allows users to see appointment details, respond to Exchange meeting invites, and schedule meetings. It also incorporates the three-day view and "Interesting Calendars" features from Sunrise.

Files in the Files tab are not stored offline; they require Internet access to view.

Security 

Outlook mobile temporarily stores and indexes user data (including email, attachments, calendar information, and contacts), along with login credentials, in a "secure" form on Microsoft Azure servers located in the United States. On Exchange accounts, these servers identify as a single Exchange ActiveSync user in order to fetch e-mail. Additionally, the app does not support mobile device management, nor allows administrators to control how third-party cloud storage services are used with the app to interact with their users. Concerns surrounding these security issues have prompted some firms, including the European Parliament, to block the app on their Exchange servers. Microsoft maintains a separate, pre-existing Outlook Web Access app for Android and iOS.

Outlook Groups 
Outlook Groups was a mobile application for Windows Phone, Windows 10 Mobile, Android and iOS that could be used with an Office 365 domain Microsoft Account, e.g. a work or school account. It is designed to take existing email threads and turn them into a group-style conversation. The app lets users create groups, mention their contacts, share Office documents via OneDrive and work on them together, and participate in an email conversation. The app also allows the finding and joining of other Outlook Groups. It was tested internally at Microsoft and launched September 18, 2015 for Windows Phone 8.1 and Windows 10 Mobile users.

After its initial launch on Microsoft's own platforms they launched the application for Android and iOS on September 23, 2015.

Outlook Groups was updated on September 30, 2015, that introduced a deep linking feature as well as fixing a bug that blocked the "send" button from working. In March 2016 Microsoft added the ability to attach multiple images, and the most recently used document to group messages as well as the option to delete conversations within the application programme.

Outlook Groups was retired by Microsoft on May 1, 2018.
The functionality was replaced by adding the "Groups node" to the folder list within the Outlook mobile app.

Internet standards compliance

HTML rendering 
Outlook 2007 was the first Outlook to switch from Internet Explorer rendering engine to Microsoft Word 2007's. This meant that HTML and Cascading Style Sheets (CSS) items not handled by Word were no longer supported. On the other hand, HTML messages composed in Word look as they appeared to the author. This affects publishing newsletters and reports, because they frequently use intricate HTML and CSS to form their layout. For example, forms can no longer be embedded in an Outlook email.

Support of CSS properties and HTML attributes 
Outlook for Windows has very limited CSS support compared to various other e-mail clients. Neither CSS1 (1996) nor CSS2 (1998) specifications are fully implemented and many CSS properties can only to be used with certain HTML elements for the desired effect. Some HTML attributes help achieve proper rendering of e-mails in Outlook, but most of these attributes are already deprecated in the HTML 4.0 specifications (1997). In order to achieve the best compatibility with Outlook, most HTML e-mails are created using multiple boxed tables, as the table element and its sub-elements support the width and height property in Outlook. No improvements have been made towards a more standards-compliant email client since the release of Outlook 2007.

Transport Neutral Encapsulation Format 

Outlook and Exchange Server internally handle messages, appointments, and items as objects in a data model which is derived from the old proprietary Microsoft Mail system, the Rich Text Format from Microsoft Word and the complex OLE general data model. When these programs interface with other protocols such as the various Internet and X.400 protocols, they try to map this internal model onto those protocols in a way that can be reversed if the ultimate recipient is also running Outlook or Exchange.

This focus on the possibility that emails and other items will ultimately be converted back to Microsoft Mail format is so extreme that if Outlook/Exchange cannot figure out a way to encode the complete data in the standard format, it simply encodes the entire message/item in a proprietary binary format called Transport Neutral Encapsulation Format (TNEF) and sends this as an attached file (usually named "winmail.dat") to an otherwise incomplete rendering of the mail/item. If the recipient is Outlook/Exchange it can simply discard the incomplete outer message and use the encapsulated data directly, but if the recipient is any other program, the message received will be incomplete because the data in the TNEF attachment will be of little use without the Microsoft software for which it was created. As a workaround, numerous tools for partially decoding TNEF files exist.

Calendar compatibility 
Outlook does not fully support data and syncing specifications for calendaring and contacts, such as iCalendar, CalDAV, SyncML, and vCard 3.0. Outlook 2007 claims to be fully iCalendar compliant; however, it does not support all core objects, such as VTODO or VJOURNAL. Also, Outlook supports vCard 2.1 and does not support multiple contacts in the vCard format as a single file. Outlook has also been criticized for having proprietary "Outlook extensions" to these Internet standards.

.msg format 

Outlook (both the web version and recent non-web versions) promotes the usage of a proprietary .msg format to save individual emails, instead of the standard .eml format. Messages use .msg by default when saved to disk or forwarded as attachments. Compatibility with past or future Outlook versions is not documented nor guaranteed; the format saw over 10 versions released since version 1 in 2008.

The standard .eml format replicates the format of emails as used for transmission and is therefore compatible with any email client which uses the normal protocols. Standard-compliant email clients, like Mozilla Thunderbird, use additional headers to store software-specific information related e.g. to the local storage of the email, while keeping the file plain-text, so that it can be read in any text editor and searched or indexed like any document by any other software.

Security concerns 
As part of its Trustworthy Computing initiative, Microsoft took corrective steps to fix Outlook's reputation in Office Outlook 2003. Among the most publicized security features are that Office Outlook 2003 does not automatically load images in HTML emails or permit opening executable attachments by default, and includes a built-in Junk Mail filter. Service Pack 2 has augmented these features and adds an anti-phishing filter.

Outlook add-ins 
Outlook add-ins are small additional programs for the Microsoft Outlook application, mainly purposed to add new functional capabilities into Outlook and automate various routine operations. The term also refers to programs where the main function is to work on Outlook files, such as synchronization or backup utilities. Outlook add-ins may be developed in Microsoft Visual Studio or third-party tools such as Add-in Express. Outlook add-ins are not supported in Outlook Web App.

From Outlook 97 on, Exchange Client Extensions are supported in Outlook. Outlook 2000 and later support specific COM components called Outlook Add-Ins. The exact supported features (such as .NET components) for later generations were extended with each release.

SalesforceIQ Inbox for Outlook 
In March 2016, Salesforce announced that its relationship intelligence platform, SalesforceIQ, would be able to seamlessly integrate with Outlook. SalesforceIQ works from inside the Outlook inbox providing data from CRM, email, and customer social profiles. It also provides recommendations within the inbox on various aspects like appointment scheduling, contacts, responses, etc.

Hotmail Connector 

Microsoft Outlook Hotmail Connector (formerly Microsoft Office Outlook Connector), is a discontinued and defunct free add-in for Microsoft Outlook 2003, 2007 and 2010, intended to integrate Outlook.com (formerly Hotmail) into Microsoft Outlook. It uses DeltaSync, a proprietary Microsoft communications protocol that Hotmail formerly used.

In version 12, access to tasks and notes and online synchronization with MSN Calendar is only available to MSN subscribers of paid premium accounts. Version 12.1, released in December 2008 as an optional upgrade, uses Windows Live Calendar instead of the former MSN Calendar. This meant that calendar features became free for all users, except for task synchronization which became unavailable. In April 2008, version 12.1 became a required upgrade to continue using the service as part of a migration from MSN Calendar to Windows Live Calendar.

Microsoft Outlook 2013 and later have intrinsic support for accessing Outlook.com and its calendar over the Exchange ActiveSync (EAS) protocol, while older versions of Microsoft Outlook can read and synchronize Outlook.com emails over the IMAP protocol.

Social Connector 
Outlook Social Connector was a free add-in for Microsoft Outlook 2003 and 2007 by Microsoft that allowed integration of social networks such as Facebook, LinkedIn and Windows Live Messenger into Microsoft Outlook. It was first introduced on November 18, 2009. Starting with Microsoft Office 2010, Outlook Social Connector is an integral part of Outlook.

CardDAV and CalDAV Connector 
Since Microsoft Outlook does not support CalDAV and CardDAV protocol along the way, various third-party software vendors developed Outlook add-ins to enable users synchronizing with CalDAV and CardDAV servers. CalConnect has a list of software that enable users to synchronize their calendars with CalDAV servers/contacts with CardDAV servers.

Importing from other email clients 
Traditionally, Outlook supported importing messages from Outlook Express and Lotus Notes. In addition, Microsoft Outlook supports POP3 and IMAP protocols, enabling users to import emails from servers that support these protocols. Microsoft Hotmail Connector add-in (described above) helps importing emails from Hotmail accounts. Outlook 2013 later integrated the functionality of this add-in and added the ability to import email (as well as a calendar) through Exchange ActiveSync protocol.

There are some ways to get the emails from Thunderbird; the first is to use a tool that can convert a Thunderbird folder to a format that can be imported from Outlook Express. This method must be processed folder by folder. The other method is to use a couple of free tools that keep the original folder structure. If Exchange is available, an easier method is to connect the old mail client (Thunderbird) to Exchange using IMAP, and upload the original mail from the client to the Exchange account.

See also 
 Address book
 Calendar (Apple)—iCal
 Comparison of email clients
 Comparison of feed aggregators
 Comparison of office suites
 GNOME Evolution
 Kontact
 List of personal information managers
 Personal Storage Table (.pst file)
 Windows Contacts

References

Notes

Citations

External links 
 
 Outlook Developer Center

1997 software
Calendaring software
Computer-related introductions in 1997
Outlook
Outlook
News aggregator software
Personal information managers
Windows email clients
Android (operating system) software
IOS software